The Torslunda plates are four cast bronze dies found in the Torslunda parish on the Swedish island Öland. They display figures in relief, representing what are presumed to be traditional scenes from Germanic mythology. The plates are moulds designed for production rather than display; by placing thin sheets of foil against the scenes and hammering or otherwise applying pressure from the back, identical images could be quickly mass-produced. The resulting pressblech foils would be used to decorate rich helmets of the sort found at Vendel, Valsgärde, and Sutton Hoo. Two of the plates may have been made as casts of existing pressblech foils.

Discovery 
The plates were discovered in a cairn in early 1870, and are in the collection of the Statens Historiska Museum. Their fame derives from containing full scenes from mythology, unlike the fragmentary and degraded scraps of pressblech foils that are known. The plates have been exhibited internationally, including from 13 May to 26 June 1966, when they were part of the exhibition Swedish Gold at the British Museum. The plates have been dated to the Vendel Period of the 6th and 7th centuries.

Description 
Each plate contains a different mythological design, traditionally labeled, displayed here counterclockwise from the bottom right A to D, as "man between bears", "man with axe holding roped animal", "walking warriors carrying spears" and "dancing man with horned head-dress and man with spear wearing wolfskin". The warriors in Plate C are depicted as wearing boar helmets.

Interpretation 
The last depiction is particularly well known for its missing right eye, shown by a laser scanner to have been struck out, likely from the original used to make the mould. This recalls the one-eyed Norse god Odin, said to have given an eye to be allowed to drink from a well whose waters contained wisdom and intelligence, and suggests that the figure on the plate is he. He is depicted along with a wolfman, interpreted as a berserker (Úlfhéðinn). The latter is perhaps a pars pro toto embodying the wolf-warriors led in ecstatic dance by the god of frenzy.

References

Bibliography 
  
  
 
  
 
 
 

 
 
 

1870 archaeological discoveries
Archaeological artifacts
Archaeological discoveries in Sweden
Bronze objects
Medieval European metalwork objects
Swedish art
Öland